Naytahwaush is a census-designated place (CDP) in Mahnomen County, Minnesota, United States. The population was 578 at the 2010 census.

Geography
According to the United States Census Bureau, the CDP has a total area of 3.3 square miles (8.5 km), of which 2.9 square miles (7.5 km) of it is land and 0.4 square miles (1.0 km) of it (11.41%) is water.

Demographics

As of the census of 2000, there were 583 people, 166 households, and 124 families residing in the CDP. There were 173 housing units at an average density of 8.9/sq mi (3.4/km). The racial makeup of the CDP was 5.15% White, 0.86% African American, 91.25% Native American, 0.34% from other races, and 2.40% from two or more races. Hispanic or Latino of any race were 1.89% of the population.

There were 166 households, out of which 52.4% had children under the age of 18 living with them, 31.3% were married couples living together, 34.3% had a female householder with no husband present, and 24.7% were non-families. 18.1% of all households were made up of individuals, and 9.0% had someone living alone who was 65 years of age or older. The average household size was 3.51 and the average family size was 3.94.

In the CDP, the population was spread out, with 42.9% under the age of 18, 13.2% from 18 to 24, 21.8% from 25 to 44, 16.8% from 45 to 64, and 5.3% who were 65 years of age or older. The median age was 21 years. For every 100 females, there were 97.6 males. For every 100 females age 18 and over, there were 85.0 males.

The median income for a household in the CDP was $26,429, and the median income for a family was $25,313. Males had a median income of $24,643 versus $26,354 for females. The per capita income for the CDP was $8,296. About 34.5% of families and 37.1% of the population were below the poverty line, including 37.6% of those under age 18 and 23.3% of those age 65 or over.

References

Census-designated places in Mahnomen County, Minnesota
Census-designated places in Minnesota